The Moors is a move on the floor exercise in artistic gymnastics. The gymnast completes a double twisting double back tumbling pass in the laid out position. The skill is named after Canadian gymnast Victoria Moors, the first gymnast to successfully compete it at a World Championships.

It remains one of the hardest skills to perform on floor as it is the only I-rated skill in Code of Points, with only the Biles II rated higher at J. It is performed in the layout position.

History
The double-twisting double layout on floor was first competed by American gymnast MyKayla Skinner at the Fiesta Bowl Invitational in Chandler, Arizona in February 2013.  In May of that year Diana Bulimar of Romania showed it in warm ups at the 2013 European Championships but did not compete it.  In August Victoria Moors competed it at the 2013 Pan American Championships.  Moors was the only of the three competitors who competed at the 2013 World Championships due to Skinner not making the 4-person squad for the United States and Bulimar dislocating her knee.  At these World Championships Moors was able to successfully complete the double-twisting double layout and the maneuver was therefore named after her.

During the remainder of the 2013–16 quad Moors and Skinner were the only two gymnasts to compete the skill.  During the 2017–20 quad Jade Carey started competing it in 2018 and has since competed it internationally at various FIG World Cup competitions and at the 2019 World Championships.  Also in 2018 Simone Biles competed the Moors both domestically and internationally at the 2018 World Championships.  Morgan Hurd competed the skill domestically at the 2018 U.S. Classic but has not yet competed it internationally.  British gymnast Amy Tinkler competed it at the 2018 British Championships.

Gymnasts Who Have Completed the Moors

References

Artistic gymnastics
Gymnastics elements